Annmarie Christensen is an American politician who served in the Vermont House of Representatives from 2017 to 2021.

References

Living people
Misericordia University alumni
Marlboro College alumni
21st-century American politicians
21st-century American women politicians
Members of the Vermont House of Representatives
Women state legislators in Vermont
Year of birth missing (living people)